Beacon High is a coeducational secondary school for 11-16-year-olds in the Tufnell Park area, located in the London Borough of Islington, England. Beacon High is a member of the Islington Futures Federation of Community Schools and the Islington Sixth Form Partnership. In the school's most recent Ofsted report, it described the school's leadership and management as Good

History
The school was first established in September 1907 as a boys' school named Camden Secondary School for Boys, it later changed its name to Holloway County Grammar School and then to Holloway Comprehensive School.

In September 2018, the Governing Body was dissolved and the governance of the school was taken over by the expanded federation of Elizabeth Garrett Anderson and Copenhagen Schools.

In June 2019, Holloway School was rebranded as Beacon High.

Present 
Beacon High offers GCSEs as programmes of study for pupils. Although the school does not operate its own sixth form, graduating pupils are guaranteed a place at City and Islington College through the City and Islington Sixth Form Consortium.

Islington Futures Federation of Community Schools 
Islington Futures is a federation of four community schools: EGA, Beacon High School, Copenhagen Primary School and Vittoria Primary School and was established in September 2018.

Jo Dibb is the Executive Headteacher of the Islington Futures Federation.

Notable former pupils

References

External links
 Beacon High official website

Secondary schools in the London Borough of Islington
Community schools in the London Borough of Islington